18 Again! is a 1988 American fantasy-comedy film directed by Paul Flaherty and starring George Burns and Charlie Schlatter. The plot involves a college student switching souls with his grandfather by means of an accident. The film is based on the song "I Wish I Was Eighteen Again" written by Sonny Throckmorton and recorded by Burns in 1980.

Plot
Jack Watson is a millionaire playboy and businessman who is about to turn 81 years old just as his grandson David is about to turn 18, but Jack laments his old age and wishes to get back to his teens once more. When an accident switches their souls, Jack gets to live his grandson's life and all that it entails: school, sports, and romance. Unfortunately, David gets the "short end of the deal", as not only is he trapped in his grandfather's 81-year-old body, but he is also in a coma. The only one who knows the truth is his longtime friend Charlie, whom Jack was able to convince by recounting experiences only they knew.

Jack gets to approach his family from a fresh point of view and doesn't always like what he sees: he's been a distant parent for his son Arnie and has repeatedly disregarded his ideas for improving the family company. The college fraternity that he coerced David into joining (his old alma mater) is bullying him on a regular basis and forcing him to write their test finals for them. He also finds out that his girlfriend Madeline is unfaithful when she tries to seduce him, thinking he's Jack's grandson. Deciding to set things right, Jack in David's body decides to take charge by convincing his father (or rather, Jack's son) to implement his ideas on the family business and uses his poker playing skills to beat the frat boys while betting $1000 that he will beat the lead frat boy Russ in the upcoming track meet. Jack also impresses a girl named Robin, who is taken with David's old-fashioned style with bow ties and his vividly recounting the Second World War and meeting President Harry S. Truman.

However, Jack realizes too late that he has willed half of everything to Madeline, who convinces Arnie and his wife to disconnect Jack's 81-year-old body from life support. Knowing that this will kill David, Jack and Charlie rush to the hospital to prevent this, wheeling Jack's body away from an orderly. When they crash in the hospital chapel, Jack and David's minds are returned to their rightful bodies, and Jack awakens. Jack still has unfinished business, as in David's body he challenged the fraternity president to a race, and now David must face him.

Jack gives David a pep talk, and David beats the frat president. Jack then encourages David to pursue an interested Robin. In private, Jack tells Arnie that his greatest mistake was trying to get him and David to relive his own life, and encourages Arnie to nurture David's interest in art, which Jack will do as well by getting David involved in the graphic design aspect of the family business. Finally, Jack confronts Madeline by saying he knows that she made a pass at David and is well aware that she is a gold digger only interested in his bank account. He throws her out of the house and lets her know that he has rewritten his will to include his family and his faithful butler Horton, whom he promptly orders to have Madeline thrown out. Robin and David start their relationship, and the movie finishes with Jack telling David everything about Harry S. Truman.

Cast
 Charlie Schlatter as David Watson/Jack Watson
 George Burns as Jack Watson/David Watson
 Tony Roberts as Arnold 'Arnie' Watson
 Miriam Flynn as  Betty Watson
 Red Buttons as Charlie
 Anita Morris as Madeline
 Pauly Shore as Barrett
 Jennifer Runyon as Robin Morrison
 George DiCenzo as Coach
 Bernard Fox as Horton
 Kenneth Tigar as Professor Swivet
 Anthony Starke as Russ
 Emory Bass as Art Teacher
 Joshua Devane as J.P.
 Benny Baker as Red
 Hal Smith as Irv
 Lance Slaughter as Mikey
 Earl Boen as Robin's Dad
 Toni Sawyer as Robin's Mom
 Stephanie Baldwin as Robin's Sister
 Kimberlin Brown as Receptionist
 Karl Wiedergott as Team Member
 Pat Crawford Brown as Old Lady

Reception 
Roger Ebert gives the film a score of 1 and a half out of 4. He compares it to Like Father Like Son and Vice Versa, calling Vice Versa the best of the three, by far. He stated, "The whole project seems to have been enveloped in a miasma of good intentions and heartwarming sentiments. There’s no edge, no bite and none of the inspired body language that made 'Vice Versa' so special. The movie makes no attempt to really imagine what it would be like to inhabit another body; it just springs the gimmick on us and starts unreeling its sitcom plot. Although Burns is, of course, a beloved institution, and any opportunity to see him is welcome, he is not given much to do in the movie, and he doesn’t do much with it...No real effort has been made to find any differences between Burns and the character he plays in this movie."

Janet Maslin was critical of the film for leaving George Burns in a coma when he is who the audience came to see, and says that it "isn't successfully aimed at anyone in particular".

18 Again! holds a 29% rating on Rotten Tomatoes based on 7 reviews.

References

External links
 
 
 
 

1980s American films
1980s English-language films
1980s fantasy comedy films
1980s teen comedy films
1980s teen fantasy films
1988 comedy films
1988 directorial debut films
1988 films
American fantasy comedy films
American teen comedy films
Body swapping in films
Films about old age
Films about wish fulfillment
Films directed by Paul Flaherty
Films scored by Billy Goldenberg
New World Pictures films